Club Deportivo Guijuelo is a Spanish football team based in Guijuelo, Province of Salamanca, in the autonomous community of Castile and León. Founded in 1974 it plays in Segunda División RFEF – Group 1, holding home games at the 1,500-seat Estadio Municipal de Guijuelo.

History 
In mid-July 1974 C.D. Guijuelo presented the first club's Board of Directors. One of the first actions was improvement of the club's infrastructure which they had the cooperation with the City Council for. Another important step was the inscription of the team in the Football Federation, achieved by the efforts of Damián Martín Barriguete and Cesar Picado de la Iglesia.

On October 12, 2016 for the first time in its history Guijuelo reached the round of 32 of the Copa del Rey by winning away game against CA Cirbonero 2:1.

Season to season

16 seasons in Segunda División B
1 season in Segunda División RFEF
3 seasons in Tercera División
1 season in Tercera División RFEF

Current squad

Out on loan

Famous players
 Pablo Zegarra
  José Freijo
 Joselito
 David Montero

References

External links
Official website 
Estadios de España 

 
Football clubs in Castile and León
Association football clubs established in 1974
1974 establishments in Spain